Voyage with Jacob is a Hungarian film directed by Pál Gábor. It was released in 1972.

Cast
 Péter Huszti - Fényes István
 Ion Bog - Jakab
 Éva Szabó - Kata
 Iván Szendrő - Lépes Feri
 Györgyi Andai - Emese
 Erika Bodnár - Eszter
 Ildikó Bánsági - Ildikó
 Marianna Moór
 Gabriella Borbás
 Kati Lázár
 Ágnes Hegedűs - Lépes anyja
 Eszter Vörös
 Árpád Gyenge - Tanár
 János Körmendi - Főnök
 Ferenc Paláncz - Lajos, a csapos

External links
 

1972 films
1972 drama films
1970s Hungarian-language films
Hungarian satirical films
Films directed by Pál Gábor
Hungarian drama films